Gosnells station is a railway station on the South Western Railway 21 kilometres from Perth Station in the suburb of Gosnells. It is served by Armadale Line services which are part of the Transperth network.

History
The original Gosnells station opened in 1905. On 17 April 2005 a new station opened 300 metres further north as part of a improvement program to rejuvenate the town centre and create a new retail main street running in an east-west direction across the train line. The station was built under the Gallop government's Building Better Train Stations program.

Services
Gosnells station is served by Transperth Armadale Line services.

The station saw 461,553 passengers in the 2013-14 financial year.

Platforms

Bus routes

References

External links

Armadale and Thornlie lines
Railway stations in Perth, Western Australia
Railway stations in Australia opened in 1905
Railway stations in Australia opened in 2005
Bus stations in Perth, Western Australia